The National Wildlife Refuge System Administration Act of 1966 provided guidelines and directives for administration and management of all areas in National Wildlife Refuge system including "wildlife refuges, areas for the protection and conservation of fish and wildlife that are threatened with extinction, wildlife ranges, game ranges, wildlife management areas, and waterfowl production areas."

References

External links

Text of the Act
 From US Fish and Wildlife Service National Wildlife Refuge Administration Act, or
 From Cornell Law's US Code Collection National Wildlife Refuge Administration Act

Summary of the Act
 From NOAA Coastal Services Center 
 Fischman, Robert, "The Significance of National Wildlife Refuges in the Development of U.S. Conservation Policy" . Journal of Land Use & Environmental Law, Vol. 21, p. 1, Fall 2005. 

1966 in law
National Wildlife Refuges of the United States
Wildlife Refuge
Wildlife Refuge
Wildlife Refuge
United States federal legislation articles without infoboxes
1966 in the environment